Soléa is a public transport operator in the French city of Mulhouse. Under contract to the Mulhouse Alsace Agglomération, it operates the city's bus network and three of the lines of the city's tram network. It also jointly operates, with the French national rail operator SNCF, the city's fourth tram line, a tram-train service.

Soléa is a mixed private and public sector company. Its principal shareholders are the transport group Transdev (67.8%), the Paris transport operator RATP (20%), the Mulhouse Alsace Agglomération (10%) and the Colmar transport operator TRACE (1%).

It has 544 employees.

Trams 

The Mulhouse tram system commenced service in 2006, and was last extended in December 2010. It now comprises three purely tram lines, plus one hybrid tram-train line:

 Line 1 from Gare Central to Châtaignier 
 Line 2 from Nouveau Bassin to Coteaux
 Line 3 from Gare Central to Lutterbach
 Tram-train line from Gare Centrale to Thann via Lutterbach

The system is operated by 27 Alstom Citadis 302 trams, which operate routes 1 to 3, and 12 Siemens Avanto tram-trains, which operate the route to Thann. On the latter route, Soléa manages the route as far as Lutterbach and provides 25% of the drivers, whilst the remainder of the route and the remaining drivers are provided by the SNCF.

Buses 
Soléa operates 21 daytime bus routes, plus a shuttle service between Gare Central and Mulhouse hospital. It also operates 13 routes on evenings, Sundays and holidays, and 13 school bus routes. It does this with a fleet of 131 buses, of which 43 are articulated buses.

References

External links 
Soléa web site

Mulhouse
Public transport operators in France
Transport in Grand Est